Yamani Hafez bin Musa (Jawi: يماني حفيظ بن موسى; born 31 October 1978) is a Malaysian politician who served as the Deputy Minister of Finance II in the Barisan Nasional (BN) administration under former Prime Minister Ismail Sabri Yaakob and former Minister Tengku Zafrul Aziz from August 2021 to the collapse of the BN administration in November 2022, Member of Parliament (MP) for Sipitang from May 2018 to November 2022 and Chairman of FELCRA Berhad from July 2020 to September 2021. He is a member of the Malaysian United Indigenous Party (BERSATU), a component of the Perikatan Nasional (PN) coalition. He is also the son of Musa Aman, the former Chief Minister of Sabah.

Personal life 
Yamani is the son of Musa Aman, the former Chief Minister of Sabah. He has an undergraduate degree of commerce from the University of Canterbury, New Zealand and master's degree in business administration from Universiti Teknologi MARA (UiTM).

Elections 
In the 2018 general election (GE14), UMNO had fielded him to contest the Sipitang parliamentary seat despite his participation into politics are being opposed by his father. He subsequently won in a three-corner contest facing a new candidate Noor Hayaty Mustapha from the Sabah Heritage Party (WARISAN) and Dayang Aezzy Liman from the Sabah People's Hope Party (PHRS).

Controversy 
After the Barisan Nasional (BN) coalition's fall in the GE14 as well following the disappearance of his father Musa Aman, Yamani was not seen in public too. He finally presented at the parliament to take his oath as a Member of Parliament on 7 January 2019, nine days shy of the 16 January deadline.

Election results

Honours 
 :
  Commander of the Order of Kinabalu (PGDK) – Datuk  (2022)

References

External links 
 

1978 births
Living people
Malaysian people of Malay descent 
People from Sabah
Malaysian people of Pakistani descent
Malaysian Muslims
Malaysian United Indigenous Party politicians
Malaysian people of Bruneian descent 
Former United Malays National Organisation politicians
Independent politicians in Malaysia
Members of the Dewan Rakyat
Kadazan-Dusun people
21st-century Malaysian politicians
People named in the Pandora Papers
Commanders of the Order of Kinabalu